Reham Abdel Ghafour (born 6 September 1978 in El Mahalla El Kubra) is an Egyptian actress and the daughter of famous Egyptian actor Ashraf Abdel Ghafour. She is graduated from Faculty of Commerce-English section. She appeared with Mohamed Henedi and Ashraf Abdel Baki in the film Saheb Sahbo.

Reham has acted in many TV series and films like Mallaki Eskinderiya, Kan yom Hobak, Gayy fel Saree''', BelAraby cinderella. She also participated in plays like Bint Bonoot, AlMalek Lear (i.e. King Lear) with the star Yehia El-Fakharany and Hamlet play at Egyptian theaters.

 Films 
 The academy (2009)
 Alghaba (i.e. The Wild) (2008) her character was named "Gamila",streets princess
 Alia ElTarab bel3 (2007) her character was named "Mona"
 Ga'alatny Mogreman (i.e. She made me a criminal) (2006) her character was named "Saly"
 Zay ElHawa (i.e. Same as the air) (2006) her character was named "Nour"
 BelAraby Cindrella (i.e. Arabic cinderella) (2006) her character was named "Tokka" (Starring role)
 Gy Fe ElSaree3 (i.e. Coming fast) (2005) her character was named "Abeer" (Starring role)
 Hareem Kareem (i.e. Kareem's girls) (2005) her character was named "Nevien" featuring Moustafa Amar.
 Malaky Eskendria (i.e. Private Alex) (2005) her character was named "Rasha Nos-hi"
 Kan Yom Hobak (i.e. The day I loved you) her character was named "Hannan"
 Sehr El oyon (i.e. Eyes' Magic) her character was named "Dina"
 Saheb Sahbo (i.e. true friend or Friend of his Friend)) her character was named "Shapinam" (Starring role)

 TV series Shekh El Arab Hammam (i.e. Hammam the Arab's Shekh) (2010) her character was named "Ward Elyaman", Hammam's daughterMesh Alf Lella w Lella (i.e. Not 1001 Nights) (2010) her character was "Shahrazad" the famous literature character of One Thousand and One NightsBent Bonot (i.e. Virgin) (2006) her character was named "Noha"Mn Gher Ma'ad (i.e. Without arrangement) (2006) her character was named "Sahar" (starring role)Andaleb Hekayet Sha'b (i.e. Abdel Halim Hafez's Biography ) (2006) She portrays Faten Hamama, the Egyptian actressAmeel 1001 (i.e. Client 1001) (2006) her character was named "Rachel"Amaken Fe ElAlb (i.e. Places in my heart) (2005) her character was named "Margeret"
Bent Mn Shubra (i.e. Girl from Shubra) her character was named "Lena"
AlHakeka w AlSarab (i.e. The reality and the fantasy ) her character was named "Salwa"
AlAmma Nour (i.e. Aunt Nour)
Hadith ElSabah W AlMasa' (i.e. Morning and Evening stories) her character was named "Sedriah"
Mas'alet Mabda2 (i.e. Just a Principle)
Fares Bela Gawad (i.e. A Knight Without a Horse)
Shams Yom Gedid (i.e. New future)
Zizenia
AlA'ela w AlNas (i.e. The Family and the community)

 Plays King Lear her character was the youngest daughter CordeliaHamlet'' her character was Olivia

References

1978 births
Reham
Living people
Egyptian television actresses
Egyptian stage actresses
People from El Mahalla El Kubra